The Lauenburg-Hohnstorf Ferry (German: Trajekt Lauenburg-Hohnstorf or Lauenburg-Hohnstorfer Elb-Traject-Anstalt) was a railway ferry over the River Elbe between Hohnstorf on the left bank of the Elbe in the old  Kingdom of Hanover (which became the Prussian province of Hanover in 1866) and Lauenburg in the Duchy of Lauenburg on the right bank which was then part of Denmark. From 15 March 1864 to 1 November 1878 the rail ferry linked the Lübeck–Lauenburg railway with the Lüneburg–Hohnstorf line. Both were sections of the Lübeck–Lüneburg railway.

Ferry operations

References 

The information in this article is mainly derived from:

 
 

Railway lines in Schleswig-Holstein
Railway lines in Lower Saxony
Lüneburg (district)
Ferries across Elbe